This is a list of snakes in North Macedonia. In the country there are 16 species of snakes, of which three are venomous.

Snakes
In North Macedonia there are 16 species of snakes:

See also
 Snakes
 Fauna of North Macedonia

References

External links
 Snakes in Macedonia on страницата kralemarko.org.mk
 In Macedonia there are only three venomous species of snakes on dnevnik.com.mk

Macedonia